Moonupeedika is a town in Thrissur District of Kerala in India. It lies in two panchayats - Kaipamangalam and Perinjanam.  

.

References

Cities and towns in Thrissur district